National Institute of Occupational Safety and Health refers to agencies of several governments relating to occupational safety and health.
 National Institute for Occupational Safety and Health (United States)—note that the name contains "for" rather than "of"
 National Institute of Occupational Safety and Health (Malaysia)
 National Institute of Occupational Safety and Health (Japan)
 National Institute of Occupational Safety and Health (Sri Lanka)
 National Institute of Occupational Health (Norway)
 National Institute for Occupational Health (South Africa)

Occupational safety and health organizations